Chapman Hill is a locality in the South West region of Western Australia in the local government area of the City of Busselton. At the 2021 census, the area had a population of 109.

The eponymous hill, which is in the Whicher Range near the source of the Vasse River, was named after the Chapman brothers, early European settlers in the Busselton area. In the 1920s the area was settled by Group 40 of the Group Settlement Scheme; a memorial to the settlers is on Chapman Hill Road. Chapman Hill contained a signal station during World War II. Cattle-farming is a major industry in the area.

References

South West (Western Australia)